Dan Tangnes (born 3 March 1979) is a Norwegian ice hockey coach. He is currently the head coach for EV Zug of the National League in Switzerland (NL).

On October 24, 2013, Tangnes was replaced by Magnus Bogren as head coach of Rögle BK, then of HockeyAllsvenskan.

As a player, Tangnes spent his career in Rögle BK, Gislaveds SK, Lillehammer IK and Jonstorps IF.

References

1979 births
Living people
Ice hockey people from Oslo
Norwegian ice hockey coaches
Norwegian ice hockey forwards
Norwegian expatriate sportspeople in Sweden
Norwegian expatriate ice hockey people
Rögle BK players
Lillehammer IK players